Maurice Faure (2 January 1922 – 6 March 2014) was a member of the French Resistance and a minister in several French governments. He was born in Azerat, Dordogne.

He was a deputy in the French parliament from 1951 to 1983 and a Senator from 1983 to 1988, representing Lot and served 25 years as Mayor of Cahors. Faure was appointed to the Constitutional Council of France by President François Mitterrand.

As secretary to the French foreign minister, he co-signed the Treaty of Rome for France in 1957, thus helping to create the European Union.

In 1957, Faure was awarded the Grand Decoration of Honour in Gold with Sash for Services to the Republic of Austria.

Faure died in March 2014 at the age of 92 in Cahors, Lot. He was a Protestant in his youth.

References

External links
 Maurice Faure 

1922 births
2014 deaths
People from Dordogne
Politicians from Nouvelle-Aquitaine
Radical Party (France) politicians
Radical Party of the Left politicians
French interior ministers
French Ministers of Justice
Government ministers of France
Deputies of the 2nd National Assembly of the French Fourth Republic
Deputies of the 3rd National Assembly of the French Fourth Republic
Deputies of the 1st National Assembly of the French Fifth Republic
Deputies of the 2nd National Assembly of the French Fifth Republic
Deputies of the 3rd National Assembly of the French Fifth Republic
Deputies of the 4th National Assembly of the French Fifth Republic
Deputies of the 5th National Assembly of the French Fifth Republic
Deputies of the 6th National Assembly of the French Fifth Republic
Deputies of the 7th National Assembly of the French Fifth Republic
French Senators of the Fifth Republic
Senators of Lot (department)
French Resistance members
French people of the Algerian War
Recipients of the Grand Decoration with Sash for Services to the Republic of Austria